Simeiz Observatory (also spelled Simeis or Simeïs) was an astronomy research observatory until the mid-1950s. It is located on Mount Koshka, Crimea, by the town of Simeiz.

Part of the Crimean Astrophysical Observatory, it is currently used for laser based studies of the orbits of satellites.

The Minor Planet Center (MPC) credits Simeiz Observatory as the location where a total of 150 minor planets were discovered by astronomers Grigory Neujmin, Sergey Belyavsky, Vladimir Albitsky, Grigory Shajn, Nikolaj Ivanov, Pelageya Shajn, Praskov'ja Parchomenko, Alexander Deutsch and Evgenij Skvorcov.

As of 2017, the discovery of the minor planet  is directly credited to Simeiz Observatory by the MPC.

History 

The Simeiz Observatory was founded by Russian amateur astronomer Nikolai Maltsov, who later became a honored member of the Russian Academy of Sciences and after whom asteroid 749 Malzovia was named. In 1900, he built a tower for refractor at his land plot near Simeiz. In 1906 – a tower with dome for Zeiss double astrograph. Both towers are preserved and being used nowadays. In 1908, Maltsov handed his observatory to Pulkovo Observatory as a present. In 1912, the first astrophysical department of Pulkovo Observatory was officially opened at the south of Russia. Simeiz observatory is situated at the level of 360 m above sea level at southern mountainside of the Crimean mountains, at Koshka mountain. A main building was restored after the Second World War on the basis of old building in modernized style with balconies decorated by columns.

Research of interstellar space and star formation zones, discovery of star rotation, creation of stellar catalogues of radial velocities, study of chemical composition of stars and the Sun brought the world publicity to Simeiz Observatory. The results of research of stars and the Sun represents an independent value.

The Department provides observing facilities for astronomers of international community and for its own staff. The following projects currently run:
 Very Long Baseline Interferometry (VLBI)
 Multi-wavelength monitoring of Active Galactic Nuclei (AGN)
 Solar and stellar activity investigations
 Molecular lines observations at mm wavelengths

Discoveries 
Minor planets, whose discovery is directly credited to the observatory (rather than a particular astronomer).

See also

References

External links 
 People and Stars History of Simeiz Observatory, Nikolay Semyon "Mirror of the week" No. 42, October 1998 
 Crimean Astrophysical Observatory, a detailed history of Simeiz and Crimean Astrophysical Observatory by Petr Pavlovich Dobronravin .
 Brief history Brief history of Simeiz and Crimean Astrophysical Observatory.
 History of minor planet observations at the Crimean astrophysical observatory,  L. I. & N. S. Chernykh (2002)

Astronomical observatories in Ukraine
Astronomical observatories built in the Soviet Union
Minor-planet discovering observatories
Buildings and structures in Crimea